Poyen may refer to:
Charles Poyen  (died 1844), French mesmerist
Poyen, Arkansas,  a town in the United States
Poyen, Kargil, a village in India